No. 14 Squadron of the Royal Air Force currently operates the Beechcraft Shadow R1 (a modified Beechcraft Super King Air) in the Intelligence, surveillance, target acquisition, and reconnaissance (ISTAR) role  from RAF Waddington.

History

World War I
No. 14 Squadron of the Royal Flying Corps was formed on 3 February 1915 at Shoreham with Maurice Farman S.11 and B.E.2 aircraft. After a few months of training it departed  for the Middle East in November of that same year for Army co-operation duties during the Sinai and Palestine Campaign. In 1916 the squadron's B.E.2s were supplemented with a small number of D.H.1A two seat fighters for escort duties, with the type remaining in use until March 1917. Other fighters operated by the squadron's fighter flight included the Bristol Scout and Vickers FB.19, but the fighter flight left the squadron in August 1917 to form No. 111 Squadron. The squadron flew in support of British forces in the Third Battle of Gaza in late 1917. In November 1917 the squadron was equipped with Royal Aircraft Factory R.E.8s, which were used to perform reconnaissance duties, attacking the Turkish Seventh Army as it retreated following the Battle of Nablus. It was recalled to the UK in January 1919 and disbanded the following month.

Squadron motto

The Squadron motto—I spread my wings and keep my promise—is believed by many, including the RAF, to be an extract from the Koran as suggested to the RAF by the Emir of Transjordan but in Arabic, this is not quite as depicted on the Squadron badge.

Between the wars
On 1 February 1920 the squadron was reformed in Ramleh by renumbering No. 111 Squadron. The squadron operated Bristol Fighters and used them for various duties including photo surveying and air policing. The squadron patrolled Trans-Jordan and Palestine for the next 20 years and it was during this period that the squadron gained its Arabic motto. The squadron fully equipped with DH.9As in January 1926. Fairey IIIFs replaced the squadron's DH.9As in November 1929, using them on reconnaissance duties during civil unrest in Palestine. The Fairey Gordon, a radial engined derivative of the IIIF re-equipped the squadron in September 1932, being used for operations against Arab rioters during the 1933 Palestine riots. In March 1938, the squadron replaced its Gordons with Vickers Wellesley monoplane bombers.

World War II
When World War II broke out the squadron was transferred to Egypt but soon returned to Amman. In May 1940, with the likelihood of war between Britain and Italy increasing rapidly, 14 Squadron was ordered to move to Port Sudan to reinforce the weak RAF forces in East Africa facing Italian forces in Ethiopia and Eritrea. On 10 June, Italy declared war on Britain and France, and on the night of 11/12 June 14 Squadron flew its first offensive mission of the Second World War, when nine Wellesleys bombed fuel storage tanks and the airfield at Massawa.  It lost its first Wellesley to Italian defences on 14 June during a second raid against Massawa. The squadron received a single Supermarine Walrus from 47 Squadron which was used for patrols over the Red Sea in July 1940, while the squadron's Wellesleys continued bombing missions against Italian targets. The Squadron started to receive twin-engined Bristol Blenheims in September that year, flying its first Blenheim mission on 20 September, and flying its final Wellesley sortie on 20 November. In March 1941 it carried out bombing raids in support of the assault on Keren.

In April 1941, following the liberation of Addis Ababa, the squadron was sent to Egypt for operations over the Western Desert. The squadron was deployed in support of Operation Brevity on 15–16 May 1941, an unsuccessful British offensive, and carried out attacks on German and Italian motor transport, with five Blenheims being shot down by Messerschmitt Bf 109 fighters of III Gruppe, Jagdgeschwader 27 while carrying out strafing attacks along the Tobruk–Capuzzo road on 21 May. The squadron flew attacks against Maleme Airfield on 25 and 27 May during the Battle of Crete, and in June, flew in support of Operation Battleaxe, another unsuccessful British offensive in the Western Desert. On 7 July 1941, the squadron withdrew from the Western Desert, being based in Palestine and Iraq until it returned to Egypt in November 1941.

On 17 August 1942, 14 Squadron was withdrawn from operations to convert to the Martin Marauder, the first RAF Squadron to operate this American bomber. The squadron flew its first operational mission with the Marauder, a maritime reconnaissance mission on 26 October 1942. The squadron used its Marauders for long-range maritime reconnaissance missions, minelaying and anti-shipping attack with torpedoes over the Aegean. The squadron's Marauders sank a tanker with torpedoes on 19 January 1943 and two more merchant ships on 21 February. In March 1943, it started performing anti-submarine missions and long-range maritime reconnaissance missions, finding targets to be attacked by other anti-shipping units, operating out of Blida and then Maison Blanche in Algeria. In May 1943 the squadron supplemented its Marauders by six ex-USAAF P-51A Mustangs on loan, which equipped an additional flight for offensive operations, but these were returned to the USAAF in July, the squadron continuing to operate the Marauder. It operated detachments in Italy and Sardinia, moving completely to Alghero in Sardinia in June 1944. In July 1944, the squadron began to operate maritime patrol operations in conjunction with the Bristol Beaufighters of 39 Squadron, with a Marauder cruising offshore and directing Beaufighters to attack any shipping spotted. The squadron flew its last Marauder mission on 21 September that year, leaving its equipment behind when it transferred back to the UK.

On its return to the UK, the squadron was based at RAF Chivenor and carried out anti-submarine mission over the Western Approaches and the Bay of Biscay using Vickers Wellington Mk.XIVs. The squadron was again disbanded on 1 June 1945 but was reborn the same day, when 143 Squadron at Banff, equipped with the De Havilland Mosquito Mk.VI in the anti-shipping strike role, was renumbered. This incarnation of the squadron was short lived, being disbanded on 31 March 1946.

With RAF Germany
Disbandment did not last long however, the following day No.128 Squadron, operating Mosquito B.16s at RAF Wahn in Germany, was renumbered No.14 squadron and the squadron lived again. In December 1947 the Mosquito B.16s were replaced with the Mosquito B.35 variant. The squadron moved to RAF Celle in September 1949, but this was a short placement as they moved again in November 1950, this time to RAF Fassberg. In 1951 the squadron received Vampire FB.5s to replace the Mosquitos, while in 1953 the Vampires made place for Venom FB.1s.
The squadron converted to the day-fighter role when it received Hunter F.4s in 1955 while based at RAF Oldenburg, where they stayed for two years before moving to RAF Ahlhorn. The squadron used the Hunters until 17 December 1962, when the unit was disbanded at RAF Gutersloh. The same day however No.88 Squadron was renumbered No.14 Squadron, flying Canberra B(I).8s from RAF Wildenrath.

On 30 June 1970 the squadron was reformed at RAF Bruggen and operated Phantom FGR.2s until April 1975, when they were replaced with the SEPECAT Jaguar. From 1976 their role at RAF Bruggen, assigned to SACEUR, was support of the army in a European land battle, first in a conventional role, and later in a nuclear delivery role should tactical nuclear weapons be used. The squadron's twelve Jaguars were expected by RAF planning staff to suffer attrition of one third their strength, leaving sufficient survivors to deliver their stockpile of eight WE.177 nuclear bombs. From 1986 the squadron's twelve Jaguars were exchanged for twelve Tornado GR.1s, for use in a similar role. Tornados were able to carry two WE.177 nuclear bombs, and the RAF staff expected that there would be enough survivors of the conventional war phase to deliver an increased stock of eighteen bombs. The squadron's role operating WE.177 nuclear bombs was programmed to remain in place until the mid 1990s.

In August 1990, the squadron was dispatched to Bahrain in response to the Iraqi invasion of Kuwait as part of Operation Granby along with two other squadrons from Bruggen, no. 9 and no. 31 Squadrons.

Iraq and Afghanistan
The squadron returned to the UK from Germany in January 2001. It operated from  RAF Lossiemouth, as the Tornado GR4 Force squadron specialising in Low Level TIALD, night electro-optical low level and operational low flying.  It participated in Operation Resinate (South), flying sorties from Ali Al Salem AB, Kuwait until January 2003.  The squadron returned to Ali Al Salem in August 2003 as part of Operation TELIC (phase 4). In September 2003, the 6 Tornado's took off from Ali Al Salem for the last time and started flying operational missions over Iraq and landing at Al Udeid Air Base in Qatar.

Four crews from the squadron took part in the first detachment of Tornado GR Force personnel to Operation HERRICK in summer 2009. 14 Squadron carried out its only autonomous detachment to Kandahar between November 2010 and February 2011, flying day and night in support of ISAF forces across Afghanistan.  The squadron mounted ground alert as well as flying numerous planned recce sorties using the RAPTOR pod, and CAS sorties equipped with Paveway IV 500 lb bombs and Dual Mode Seeker MBDA Brimstone missiles.

After its return to the UK in 2011, it was announced that the squadron would be disbanded as one of the two Tornado squadrons due to cease operations as part of the 2010 SDSR along with XIII Squadron based at RAF Marham.

The squadron ceased operations in March 2011, and, after a formal review by the Duke of York, was formally disbanded on 1 June 2011. Squadron Leader Eric Aldrovandi, a Burmese Python, who had served as the regimental mascot and had been with the squadron since its transition to the Tornado in 1985, took the opportunity to retire, and was transferred to Amazonia, a visitor attraction at Strathclyde Country Park.

Reformation
The Squadron was re-formed on 14 October 2011 at RAF Waddington operating the Beechcraft Shadow R1 in a Tactical ISR support role, an activity which had previously been operated as a Flight under V(AC) Squadron.

From September 2014, the squadron temporarily relocated to Coningsby along with V(AC) Squadron due to the resurfacing of RAF Waddington's runway which took over a year to complete. It was announced in 2017 that the Squadron's fleet of five Shadow R1 would be increased by three and further upgrades would be funded.

Aircraft operated
Aircraft operated included:

 B.E.2c: 1915–1917
 D.H.1A: 1916–1917 (for escort work with B.E.2)
 R.E.8: 1917–1918
 Bristol Fighter: 1920-1930s
 De Havilland D.H.9A: 1924–1929
 Fairey IIIF: 1929–1932
 Fairey Gordon: 1932
 Wellesley Mk.I: 1938–1940
 Blenheim Mk.IV: 1940–1942
 Marauder Mk.I: 1942–1944
 P-51A Mustang 
 Wellington Mk.XIV: 1944–1945
 Mosquito Mk.VI/B.16/B.35: 1945–1951
 Vampire FB.5: 1951–1955
 Venom FB.1: 1953–1955
 Hunter F.4/F.6: 1955–1962
 Canberra B(I).8: 1962–1970
 Phantom FGR.2: 1970–1975
 Sepecat Jaguar GR.1: 1975–1985
 Tornado GR.1/GR.1A: 1985–2004
 Tornado GR.4: 2004–2011
 Shadow R1: 2011–present

See also
List of Royal Air Force aircraft squadrons

References

Notes

Bibliography
 Ashworth, Chris. Encyclopedia of Modern Royal Air Force Squadrons. Wellingborough, UK:PSL, 1989. .
 Bowyer, Michael J.F and John D.R. Rawlings. Squadron Codes, 1937–56. Cambridge, Cambridgeshire, UK: Patrick Stephens Ltd., 1979. .
 Bruce, J. M. The Aeroplanes of the Royal Flying Corps (Military Wing). London: Putnam, 1982. .
 Flintham, Vic and Andrew Thomas. Combat Codes: A Full Explanation and Listing of British, Commonwealth and Allied Air Force Unit Codes Since 1938. Shrewsbury, Shropshire, UK: Airlife Publishing Ltd., 2003. .
 Halley, James J. The Squadrons of the Royal Air Force. Tonbridge, Kent, UK: Air Britain (Historians) Ltd, 1980. ISNM 0-85130-083-9.
 Halley, James J. The Squadrons of the Royal Air Force & Commonwealth, 1918–1988. Tonbridge, Kent, UK: Air-Britain (Historians) Ltd., 1988. .
 Jefford, C.G. RAF Squadrons, a Comprehensive Record of the Movement and Equipment of all RAF Squadrons and their Antecedents since 1912. Shrewsbury: Airlife Publishing, 1998 (second edition 2001). .
 Lewis, Peter. Squadron Histories: R.F.C, R.N.A.S and R.A.F., 1912–59. London: Putnam, 1959.
 "Marauder: Mr Martin's Mean Machine: Part Two". Air International, February 1988, Vol. 34, No. 2, pp. 75–82, 94. .
 Moyes, Philip J.R. Bomber Squadrons of the RAF and their Aircraft. London: Macdonald and Co., 1964.
 Moyes, Philip J.R. Bomber Squadrons of the RAF and their Aircraft. London: Macdonald and Jane's (Publishers) Ltd., 1976. .
 "No. 14 (Bomber) Squadron". Flight, Vol XXVI, No. 1308, 18 January 1934. pp. 49–53.
 Napier, Michael. "Winged Crusaders: The Wellesley Years". Aeroplane, June 2013, Vol. 41 No. 6. pp. 96–102. ISSN 0143-7240.
 Napier, Michael. Blue Diamonds: The Exploits of 14 Squadron RAF 1945-2015. Pen & Sword, 2015. 
 Orange, Dr. Vincent; The Lord Deramore; Wing Commander E. Donovan and Air Vice Marshal Deryck C. Stapleton. Winged Promises: A History of No. 14 Squadron RAF, 1915–1945. RAF Fairford, UK: The Royal Air Force Benevolent Fund Enterprises, 1996. .
 Rawlings, John D.R. Coastal, Support and Special Squadrons of the RAF and their Aircraft. London: Jane's Publishing Company Ltd., 1982. .
 Rawlings, John D.R. Fighter Squadrons of the RAF and their Aircraft. London: Macdonald and Jane's (Publishers) Ltd., 1969 (new edition 1976, reprinted 1978). .
 Shores, Christopher. Dust Clouds in the Middle East: The Air War for East Africa, Iraq, Syria, Iran and Madagascar, 1940–42. London: Grub Street, 1996. .
 Shores, Christopher; Massimello, Giovanni; and Russell Guest. A History of the Mediterranean Air War 1940–1945: Volume One: North Africa June 1940 – January 1942. London: Grub Street, 2012. .
 Shores, Christopher, Massimello, Giovanni; Guest, Russell; Olynyk, Frank; and Winfried Bock. A History of the Mediterranean Air War 1940–1945: Volume Two: North African Desert February 1942 – March 1943. London: Grub Street, 2012. .
 Shores, Christopher; Massimello, Giovanni; Guest, Russell; Olynyk, Frank; and Winfried Bock. A History of the Mediterranean Air War 1940–1945: Volume Three: Tunisia and the End in Africa: November 1942 – May 1943. London: Grub Street, 2016. .
 Shores, Christopher; Massimello, Giovanni; Guest, Russell; Olynyk, Frank; Bock, Winfried and Andy Thomas. A History of the Mediterranean Air War 1940–1945: Volume Four: Sicily and Italy to the Fall of Rome: 14 May 1943 – 5 June 1944. London: Grub Street, 2018. .
 Shores, Christopher; Massimello, Giovanni; Guest, Russell; Olynyk, Frank; Bock, Winfried and Andy Thomas.  A History of the Mediterranean Air War 1940–1945: Volume Five: From the Fall of Rome to the End of the War 1944 – 1945. London: Grub Street, 2021. .
 Thetford, Owen. "By Day and by night – Part 3". Aeroplane Monthly, August 1992, Vol. 20 No. 8. pp. 16–22. .
Thetford, Owen. "Fairey IIIF and Gordon in Service: Part 1". Aeroplane Monthly, May 1994, Vol 22 No 5 Issue 253. London:IPC. pp. 32–38. .
Thetford, Owen. "Fairey IIIF and Gordon in Service: Part 2". Aeroplane Monthly, June 1994, Vol 22 No 6. pp. 16–20. .

External links

 14 Squadron on RAF Website
 14 Squadron Association and history
 Rickard, J. (16 May 2007), No. 14 Squadron (RAF): World War II
 Official history No. 14 Squadron
 Unofficial history No. 14 Squadron and much more

Military units and formations established in 1915
Military units and formations disestablished in 2011
Military units and formations of the Gulf War
014 Squadron
014 Squadron
1915 establishments in the United Kingdom
Military units and formations in Mandatory Palestine in World War II
R